The Changan Linmax or Changan Lingxuan (凌轩) is a 7-seater compact MPV produced by Changan Automobile.

Overview

The Changan Linmax was launched on the Chinese car market in May 2017 with prices starting from 67,900 yuan and ending at 80,900 yuan.

Oushang A800
The Oushang A800 is a rebadged version of the Changan Linmax, with the Changan Lingxuan sold by Changan's passenger car division and the Oushang A800 sold by Oushang, which is their commercial division.

References

External links
 (Changan Linmax)
 (Oushang A800)

Cars introduced in 2017
Linmax
Compact MPVs
Cars of China
Changan Automobile vehicles